John Cipollina (August 24, 1943 – May 29, 1989) was a guitarist best known for his role as a founder and the lead guitarist of the prominent San Francisco rock band Quicksilver Messenger Service.  After leaving Quicksilver he formed the band Copperhead, was a member of the San Francisco All Stars and later played with numerous other bands.

Early years
John and his twin sister Manuela were born in Berkeley, California, on August 24, 1943.  Cipollina attended Tamalpais High School, in Mill Valley, California, as did his brother, Mario (born 1954), and sister, Antonia (born 1952). Their father, Gino, was of Italian ancestry (Genovese and Piemontese origins).
He was a realtor, and their mother, Evelyn, and godfather, José Iturbi, were concert pianists.

John showed great promise as a classical pianist in his youth, but his father gave him a guitar when he was 12 and this quickly became his primary instrument.

Equipment and technique
Cipollina had a unique guitar sound, mixing solid state and valve amplifiers as early as 1965. He is considered one of the fathers of the San Francisco sound, a form of psychedelic rock.

I like the rapid punch of solid-state for the bottom, and the rodent-gnawing distortion of the tubes on top.

To create his distinctive guitar sound, Cipollina developed a one-of-a-kind amplifier stack. His Gibson SG guitars had two pickups, one for bass and one for treble. The bass pickup fed into two Standel bass amps on the bottom of the stack, each equipped with two 15-inch speakers. The treble pickups fed two Fender amps: a Fender Twin Reverb and a Fender Dual Showman that drove six Wurlitzer horns.

Copperhead and Career after Quicksilver Messenger Service
After leaving Quicksilver in 1971, Cipollina formed the band Copperhead with early Quicksilver member Jim Murray (who was soon to leave for Maui, Hawaii), former Stained Glass member Jim McPherson, drummer David Weber, Gary Phillipet (AKA Gary Phillips (keyboardist), later a member of Bay Area bands Earthquake and The Greg Kihn Band), and Pete Sears. Sears was shortly thereafter replaced by current and longtime Bonnie Raitt bassist James "Hutch" Hutchinson who played on the Copperhead LP and stayed with the band for its duration. Copperhead disbanded in mid 1974 after becoming a staple in the SF Bay Area and touring the West Coast, Hawaii (Sunshine Crater Fest on New Years Day of 1973 with Santana), the South (opening dates for Steely Dan) and the Midwest.

In May 1974 Cipollina and Link Wray, whose playing and style had influenced John as a young musician and who he had met through bassist Hutch Hutchinson, performed a series of shows together along the West Coast (with Copperhead rhythm section Hutchinson & Weber and keyboardist David Bloom) culminating at The Whiskey in LA where they performed for four nights (May 15–19) on a bill with Lighthouse (band). Cipollina continued to occasionally perform with Wray for the next couple of years.

During the 1980s, Cipollina performed with a number of bands, including Fish & Chips, Thunder and Lightning, the Dinosaurs and Problem Child.  He was a founding member of Zero and its rhythm guitarist until his death.  Most often these bands played club gigs in the San Francisco Bay Area, where Cipollina was well-known.

Experience with Man
In 1975, the Welsh psychedelic band Man toured the United States, towards the end of which, they played two gigs at the San Francisco Winterland (March 21 and 22), which were such a success that promoter Bill Graham paid them a bonus and rebooked them. While waiting for the additional gigs, the band met and rehearsed with Cipollina, who played with them at Winterland in April 1975. After this, Cipollina agreed to play a UK tour which took place in May 1975, during which their "Roundhouse gig" was recorded.

Rumors that Micky Jones had to overdub Cipollina's parts, as his guitar was out of tune, before their Maximum Darkness album could be released are exaggerated; only one track, "Bananas", was to have his track replaced, per Deke Leonard. "Everything ... which sounds like Cipollina is Cipollina."

The album eventually reached #25 in the UK album charts.

Death and legacy
Cipollina died on May 29, 1989 at age 45. His cause of death was alpha-1 antitrypsin deficiency, which he suffered from most of his life and which is exacerbated by smoking.

Quicksilver Messenger Service fans paid tribute to him the following month in San Francisco at an all-star concert at the Fillmore Auditorium which featured Nicky Hopkins, Pete Sears, David Freiberg, and John's brother Mario, an original member of Huey Lewis and the News. Cipollina's one of a kind massive amplifier stack was donated, along with one of his customized Gibson SG guitars, and effects pedals, for display in the Rock and Roll Hall of Fame and Museum in 1995.

In 2003, Rolling Stone Magazine ranked Cipollina 32nd on their list of the 100 greatest guitarists of all time.

Discography

Quicksilver Messenger Service
 1968: Quicksilver Messenger Service
 1969: Happy Trails
 1969: Shady Grove
 1970: Just for Love
 1970: What About Me
 1975: Solid Silver

with Brewer and Shipley

 1971: Shake off the Demon (Kama Sutra)

with Papa John Creach

 1971: Papa John Creach (Grunt Records)

with Mickey Hart
 1972: Rolling Thunder

Copperhead
 1973: Copperhead (Columbia)

with Man

 1975: Maximum Darkness

Maximum Darkness LP (1975) United Artists: CD (1991) BGO CD 43: CD Re-mix (2008) Esoteric ECLEC 2061 
Micky Jones, Deke Leonard, Martin Ace, Terry Williams, John Cipollina
Recorded at The Roundhouse, Chalk Farm, 26 May 1975

Freelight
 1977: unreleased demos

Terry and the Pirates
 1979  Too Close For Comfort (Wild Bunch)
 1980  Doubtful Handshake (Line Records)
 1981  Wind Dancer (Rag Baby, Line Records)
 1982  Rising of the Moon (Rag Baby, Line Records)
 1987  Acoustic Rangers (Sawdust Records)
 1990  Silverado Trail (Big Beat Records)

Solo album

 1980: John Cipollina's Raven (Line Records)
re-released in 2006 as Raven (Acadia) with 7 additional tracks

Re-release Tracklist 
1. Rock & Roll Nurse
2. True Golden Touch
3. Do What You Do
4. Unvicious Circle
5. True Reward
6. Grass Is Always Greener
7. Clouds
8. All Worth The price
9. Ride (Highway Song)
10. Burning Corte Madera
11. The Truth
12. Bad News
13. Razor Blade4 & Rattlesnake
14. Prayers

with Nick Gravenites

 1980: Blue Star (Line Records)

The Nick Gravenites - John Cipollina Band

 1982: Monkey Medicine (Line Records)
 1991: Live At Rodon "Nick Gravenites and John Cipollina"; recorded 12/31/1987; (Music Box)

The Dinosaurs
 1988: Dinosaurs

with Merrell Fankhauser
 1986: Dr. Fankhauser

Zero
 1987: Here Goes Nothin (Relix Records)
 1990: Nothin Goes Here] (Mobile Fidelity Sound Lab)
 1991: Go Hear Nothin (Live) (Whirled Records)

Videos 
  Dino's Song

References

External links
 JohnCipollina.com - Memorial website
 John Cipollina MySpace
 Bay-Area-Bands.com - 'John Cipollina:  The Life And Death Of San Francisco's Most Prolific Guitarist', William Ruhlmann
 [ allmusic.com] - All-Music Guide Entry
 John Cipollina collection at the Internet Archive's live music archive

 John Cipollina Electric GuitarSlinger - Movie Trailer

1943 births
1989 deaths
American rock guitarists
American male guitarists
Deaths from emphysema
People from Mill Valley, California
Musicians from the San Francisco Bay Area
Quicksilver Messenger Service members
Art rock musicians
Tamalpais High School alumni
Lead guitarists
20th-century American guitarists
Man (band) members
Copperhead (band) members
Guitarists from California
20th-century American male musicians
The Dinosaurs members